Stillman may refer to:

Stillman (surname)
Stillman, Michigan
Stillman College, Alabama
Stillman Valley, Illinois
Stillman's Run Battle Site
W. Paul Stillman School of Business, Seton Hall University